The Firewall Forward CAM 125 is a  four-cylinder, four-stroke, liquid-cooled piston aircraft engine built by Firewall Forward Aero Engines. The engine is based on a Honda automotive piston engine.

Applications
 Europa XS

Specifications (CAM 125)

See also

References

Notes

External links
 Firewall Forward Aero Engines

1990s aircraft piston engines
Firewall Forward aircraft engines